Bibinagar railway station (station code:BN) is located in Bibinagar, Bhuvanagiri district which lies on the – and –Secunderabad.

Services
MEMU service starts at Bibinagar railway station and ends at the Falaknuma railway station.

References

Railway stations in Nalgonda district